Allen Kerr AO, FRS, FAA (born 21 May 1926) is a Scottish-born Australian biologist. He served as Professor of Plant Pathology at the University of Adelaide. His most significant work was his study of crown gall - a plant cancer induced by Agrobacterium tumerfaciens.

Biography 
Kerr was born in Edinburgh on 21 May 1926. He gained a BSc degree at the University of Edinburgh.

From 1947-1951 he was Assistant Mycologist at the North of Scotland College of Agriculture. 
From 1951-1980 he was Lecturer, then Senior Lecturer, then Reader in Plant Pathology at the University of Adelaide.
From 1978-1983 he was Vice-President of the International Society for Plant Pathology.
From 1980-1983 he was President of the Australasian Plant Pathology Society.

In 1978 he was elected Fellow of the Australian Academy of Science.
In 1986 he was elected Fellow of the Royal Society.
In 1990 he received the inaugural Australia Prize for his work with plant genetics and biology.

In 1990 he became Head of the Department of Plant Pathology at the University of Adelaide, and
in 1991 he became Head of the Department of Crop Protection at the University of Adelaide.

Kerr celebrated his 90th birthday in 2016.

Awards
1978 - Fellow of the Australian Academy of Science (FAA)
1978 - Walter Buffitt Prize of the Royal Society of New South Wales
1982 - Ruth Allen Award of the American Phytopathological Society
1986 - Fellow of the Royal Society (FRS)
1990 - Inaugural Australia Prize
1991 - Foreign Associate of the US National Academy of Sciences
1991 - Elvin Charles Stackman Award of the University of Minnesota
1992 - Officer of the Order of Australia (AO)
1995 - Fellow of the Australasian Plant Pathology Society
1996 - Fellow of the American Phytopathological Society
2001 - Fellow of the American Academy of Microbiology

References

External links
 100 Years of Australian Innovation - No Gall, biotechnology-innovation.com.au

1926 births
Living people
Scientists from Edinburgh
Alumni of the University of Edinburgh
Australian biologists
Australian geneticists
Fellows of the Australian Academy of Science
Fellows of the Royal Society
Foreign associates of the National Academy of Sciences
Australia Prize recipients
Officers of the Order of Australia